"Candidatus Karelsulcia muelleri" is an aerobic, gram-negative, bacillus bacterium that is a part of the phylum Bacteroidota. "Ca. K. muelleri" is an obligate and mutualistic symbiotic microbe commonly found occupying specialized cell compartments of sap-feeding insects called bacteriocytes. A majority of the research done on "Ca. K. muelleri" has detailed its relationship with the host Homalodisca vitripennis. Other studies have documented the nature of its residency in other insects like the maize leafhopper (Cicadulina) or the spittlebug (Cercopoidea). "Ca. K. muelleri" is noted for its exceptionally minimal genome and it is currently identified as having the smallest known sequenced Bacteroidota genome at only 245 kilobases.

Discovery
"Ca. K. muelleri" was classified under microscope in 2005 by the evolutionary biologist Nancy A. Moran. The endosymbiont was found in the dissected bacteriocyte of the spittlebug (Calstopter arizonana). The genus "Candidatus Sulcia" is named after Vytváření Karel Šulc, a Moravian embryologist who was one of the first scientists to recognize that the insect bacteriome is an organ where bacteria reside. The name was amended to "Ca. Karelsulcia" in 2017 to avoid breach of the nomenclatural code, as Sulcia is already a genus of spiders. The species, muelleri, has been named in the honor of H. J. Müller, (not to be confused with Hermann Joseph Muller) who speculated in 1960 that there was a parallel evolutionary history between endosymbionts and a select clade of insect hosts known as Auchenorrhyncha. "Ca. K. muelleri" is a member of the order Flavobacteriales. It is currently not classified as a member of any taxonomic family.

Morphology
Little has been documented about the morphology of "Ca. K. muelleri".

"Ca. K. muelleri" is a rod-shaped bacterium measuring 5–7 μm in length, .7 μm in diameter and 2–5 μm in width. Because "Ca. K. muelleri" lacks most of the genes responsible for cell division and membrane synthesis, it is sometimes observed to extend to unusual lengths of up to 100 μm during part of its life cycle.

Like all other Flavobacteriales, "Ca. K. muelleri" is gram-negative.

Phylogeny
The phylogeny of "Ca. K. muelleri" has been discovered to follow the phylogeny of the Hemiptera clade, Auchenorrhyncha. The first association between "Ca. K. muelleri" and Auchenorrhyncha is estimated to have occurred sometime between 260 and 280 million years ago. Further evidence supports the idea that "Ca. K. muelleri" has coevolved with another symbiotic lineage from the taxonomic class Betaproteobacteria. The result of this coevolution can be noticed through the fact that both "Ca. K. muelleri" and its host leave cofactor and vitamin production to another member of the symbiotic relationship. Although the co-residents of "Ca. K. muelleri" are not always of the class Betaproteobacteria, contemporary analyses have shown that they often are. The Betaproteobacteria ancestor is suggested to have diversified into the genera Zinderia, Nasuia and Vidania.

There are currently 9 unique strains of "Ca. K. muelleri" that have been identified through a complete genome sequence. They can all be found here.

"Candidatus Karelsulcia" and the Flavobacteria
The tree below demonstrates the position of "Ca. K. muelleri" with respect to some other members of the class Flavobacteriia. The tree was constructed by comparing the peptide sequences of ten different types of proteins. The proteins used were the DNA polymerase III beta-subunit, initiation factor IF-2, leucyl-tRNA synthetase, the phenylalanine—tRNA ligase beta-subunit, VARS, elongation factor Tu, the RNA polymerase beta-subunit, and the ribosomal proteins L2, S5, and S11. Where "Ca. K. muelleri" is found occupying the body of Auchenorrhyncha hosts, the other members of Flavobacteriia are found residing in freshwater bodies and soils. The inference for the long, isolated stretch of the "Ca. K. muelleri" branch is that there has been a high frequency of base-pair substitution which has led to noticeable genetic differences between "Ca. K. muelleri" and most other Flavobacteriia.

Phylogeny using 120 bacterial markers from known genomes (see GTDB) place the bacterium under family Blattabacteriaceae. Using 11 full genomes of acceptable quality, the database is able to define two species-level groups.

Genomics
The "Ca. K. muelleri", strain GWSS genome was completely sequenced at McDonnell Genome Institute using Illumina dye sequencing. The genome is an exceptionally reduced genome, where the genetic range of "Ca. K. muelleri" is only 10% of that of Escherichia colis. It is composed of one circular chromosome that measures 245,530 kilobases long. There are neither any plasmids nor any other mobile genetic elements. The genome contains a total of 263 genes: 227 protein genes, 36 RNA genes and one pseudogene. Of the 227 different polypeptides, 99 of them are enzymes and another 9 are transport proteins. The GC-content is 22.4%.

A distinct feature of the "Ca. K. muelleri" genome is the presence of three unique rRNA sequences at the positions of (486-504), (1001-1016), (1418-1431). The implications of these unique sequences are not identified.

Reduced genome
The "Ca. K. muelleri" genome is what scientists refer to as a reduced genome; it is categorized by the apparent evolutionary loss of many ostensibly essential genes related to processes like DNA repair, translation or cell membrane biosynthesis. The conditions required for genome reduction can be multifaceted, however they often involve some form of stability. The occurrence of genome reduction raises interesting questions about what the minimal requirements for a functioning genome are. Scientists are currently testing their hypotheses about the matter by engineering their own reduced genomes.

Symbiosis
"Ca. K. muelleri" is a symbiont for a group of insects classified under the suborder Auchenorrhyncha. Usual hosts are cicadas, leafhoppers, treehoppers, spittlebugs, and planthoppers. "Ca. K. muelleri" is always found co-residing its host with another bacterial endosymbiont from the phylum Pseudomonadota. For example, "Ca. K. muelleri" and "Candidatus Zinderia insecticola" are both found to live in the bacteriome of select species of the spittlebug.

Insect-associated symbionts have been found to share a similar set of features. All symbionts appear to possess a reduced genome, have a high GC-content and bear a more frequent base-pair substitution rate compared to their free-living ancestors.

Because of symbiosis, hosts may be able to utilize metabolic pathways they might not be able to use if their endosymbionts were absent; one relevant example is the ability for sap-feeding insects to survive off of relatively nutrient-poor food sources, e.g. xylem and phloem.

Symbiosis with the glassy-winged sharpshooter
Most of the contemporary research concerning the nature of the symbiosis between "Ca. K. muelleri" and its hosts has been conducted on the glassy-winged sharpshooter. "Ca. K. muelleri" is always found inside the bacteriocyte of a host along with at least one other endosymbiont; The GSWW strain of "Ca. K. muelleri" is found within the glassy-winged sharpshooter along with the Gammaproteobacterium, Baumannia cicadellinicola. Genomic analysis has revealed the respective metabolic roles for each other members of this symbiotic triangle. The glassy-winged sharpshooter, which feeds on the xylem of plants, supplies simple amino acids and carbon sources for the two endosymbionts. In return, "Ca. K. muelleri" uses the basic materials to synthesize complex amino acids like homoserine or L-threonine. Baumannia cicadellinicola is reported to provide most of the cofactors and vitamins for the system.

One unanswered question about this symbiotic relationship asks how the endosymbionts receive a sufficient amount nitrogen. This speculation arises due to the dilute and nutrient-poor character of xylem. Although nitrogen assimilation was hypothesized, genomic analysis suggests that "Ca. K. muelleri" lacks the ability to perform this function.

Metabolic exchange
Listed below is a model of the symbiotic metabolic exchange based on the metabolites that are used by "Ca. K. muelleri" and the metabolites that are produced by "Ca. K. muelleri". The glassy-winged sharpshooter is mostly responsible for providing "Ca. K. muelleri" with nutrients and basic amino acids received from the xylem it feeds on. "Ca. K. muelleri", in return, produces more complex substrates.

Biology and metabolism
"Ca. K. muelleri" is found in the bacteriocytes of their insect hosts. The only time when the bacterial cells are not found in the bacteriocyte compartments is when they are transferred vertically from the host to their host's offspring.

Evidence suggests that "Ca. K. muelleri" utilizes aerobic respiration. ATP is synthesized by way of a cytochrome c oxidase catalyzed termination. The cytochrome is of the type cbb-3.

The electron donor for "Ca. K. muelleri" is implied to be some carbon source retrieved from the sap-feeding diet of its host. Some examples are glutamate, malate and glucose; all of which are found in xylem sap. 

The symbiont harvests reducing power in the form of NADH.

The analysis of "Ca. K. muelleri", strain GWSS's reduced genome suggests that a proportionate amount of the genes preserved over its evolution are dedicated to amino acid biosynthesis. 21.3% of its protein-coding genes are dedicated to creating amino acids, while another 33% is dedicated to translation-related processes. "Ca. K. muelleri" is usually capable of synthesizing 8 of its essential amino acids: leucine, valine, threonine, isoleucine, lysine, arginine, phenylalanine, and tryptophan. Some strains of "Ca. K. muelleri" are incapable of making the amino acid, tryptophan. It receives its other two amino acids – methionine and histidine from either its host or its co-symbiont. Sulcia muelleri is responsible for making two complex amino acids for its host: homoserine and 2-ketovaline. "Ca. K. muelleri" lacks a full set of Aminoacyl tRNA synthetases; surprisingly, however, it possesses all of the genes necessary to code for all 20 amino acids.

Other proteins that "Ca. K. muelleri" makes include a couple of transport proteins; the microbe creates organic cation transport proteins, antibiotic-related transporters and heavy-metal ion transporters.

"Ca. K. muelleri" is marked down for containing only two genes dedicated to cofactor or vitamin production; these genes code for the synthesis of menaquinone. "Ca. K. muelleri" receives most of its cofactors or vitamins from its cosymbiont.

"Ca. K. muelleri" has a minimal set of genes assigned for DNA housekeeping purposes. The only genes it has for DNA repair are the mutL and mutS genes.

References

External links
 KeggGenome - A list of all of the currently sequenced strains of "Ca. K. muelleri"
 Uniprot.Org - A list some currently sequenced strains of "Ca. K. muelleri"
 BioCyc.Org - An overview of the complete and sequenced genome of "Ca. K. muelleri", strain GWSS

Flavobacteria
Candidatus taxa